I Am Nezha (我是哪吒) is a 2016 Chinese animated film directed by Shu Zhan. It was released in China on October 1, 2016. The plot is based on Chinese legends.

Cast
Tao Dian
Han Jiaojiao
Liu Yao
Peng Bo
Zou Liang
Liang Dawei
Yao Yanze
Meng Xianglong
Wang Bochao 
Hu Yi
Wu Yifei
Zhang Huanzhao

Reception
The film grossed  at the Chinese box office.

See also
Nezha

References

2016 animated films
2016 computer-animated films
2016 films
Chinese animated films
Chinese computer-animated films
Animated feature films
Chinese fantasy films
Films based on Chinese myths and legends
Films based on Chinese novels
Works based on Investiture of the Gods